George Alvarez is a Cuban-American actor known for his work on the soap operas General Hospital, Port Charles and Guiding Light.

Early life
George Alvarez was born in Cuba. His family emigrated to the United States in the 1950s, and Alvarez grew up in West New York, New Jersey. He graduated from Memorial High School. He subsequently studied advertising at Parsons School of Design in Manhattan but eventually decided that he did not wish to pursue that field solely to make money, preferring something that would allow him to more fully express his artistic side.

Career
Alvarez worked at Studio 54 in its original heyday, and through the connections he made there, he responded to a casting call for a film. He got the part, but the project, and early attempt to adapt the Anne Rice novel Interview with the Vampire. Nonetheless, Alvarez realized that acting was what he wished to do, saying, "You get to pretend, get to be a kid again, and get paid well to do it."

After doing some theater work in New York, Alvarez moved to Los Angeles to more easily find film and television work. He also began to develop a passion for writing screenplays.

In the 1990s Alvarez got a two-day part on the soap opera General Hospital, which led to a long-term role on that show's spinoff, Port Charles. In 1999, when the series Guiding Light, which films in New York, sought to develop the role of Ray Santos, Alvarez, who was eager to return to New York to be with his growing sons, took the part.

Personal life
Alvarez has two sons. As of 2000, he lives in his childhood home, a brownstone on Boulevard East in West New York, New Jersey, that he had renovated when he returned to the East Coast in 1999.

Filmography

Film

Television

References

External links

20th-century American male actors
21st-century American male actors
Male actors from New Jersey
American male film actors
Year of birth missing (living people)
Cuban emigrants to the United States
Living people
Memorial High School (West New York, New Jersey) alumni
People from West New York, New Jersey